The enzyme (2R)-sulfolactate sulfo-lyase (EC 4.4.1.24) catalyzes the reaction 

(2R)-3-sulfolactate  pyruvate + hydrogensulfite

This enzyme belongs to the family of lyases, specifically the class of carbon-sulfur lyases.  The systematic name of this enzyme class is (2R)-3-sulfolactate hydrogensulfite-lyase (pyruvate-forming). Other names in common use include Suy, SuyAB, and 3-sulfolactate bisulfite-lyase.

References 

EC 4.4.1
Enzymes of unknown structure